The following television stations broadcast on digital channel 9 in the United States:

 K09AI-D in Las Vegas, New Mexico
 K09BE-D in Ekalaka, Montana
 K09BG-D in Basin, Montana
 K09BI-D in Methow, Washington
 K09BX-D in Saco, Montana
 K09CJ-D in Cedar City, Utah, on virtual channel 2, which rebroadcasts KUTV
 K09DF-D in Juliaetta, Idaho
 K09DM-D in Cortez, Colorado
 K09DW-D in Ruth, Nevada
 K09DY-D in Westcliffe, Colorado
 K09EA-D in Ely & Mcgill, Nevada
 K09EP-D in Grants, etc., New Mexico
 K09ES-D in Cashmere, Washington
 K09FJ-D in Pioche, Nevada
 K09FK-D in Ursine, Nevada
 K09FL-D in Caliente, Nevada
 K09FQ-D in Thompson Falls, Montana
 K09HY-D in Glasgow, Montana
 K09IV-D in Plevna, Montana
 K09JG-D in Malta, Montana
 K09KJ-D in Tierra Amarilla, New Mexico
 K09LO-D in Cascade, Idaho
 K09LW-D in Martinsdale/Lennep, Montana
 K09MH-D in White Sulphur Springs, Montana
 K09MY-D in Polaris, Montana
 K09NH-D in Shungnak, Alaska
 K09NI-D in Mekoryuk, Alaska
 K09NK-D in Perryville, Alaska
 K09NO-D in Pilot Point, Alaska
 K09OT-D in Valdez, Alaska
 K09OV-D in Kotzebue, Alaska
 K09OW-D in Nome, Alaska
 K09OY-D in Colstrip, Montana
 K09PC-D in Grayling, Alaska
 K09PJ-D in Ouray, Colorado
 K09PL-D in Dingle, etc., Idaho
 K09PO-D in Chevak, Alaska
 K09QC-D in McGrath, Alaska
 K09QG-D in Chalkyitsik, Alaska
 K09QH-D in Kenai, Alaska
 K09QK-D in Karluk, Alaska
 K09QM-D in Nelson Lagoon, Alaska
 K09QP-D in Kake, Alaska
 K09QR-D in Gambell, Alaska
 K09QU-D in Togiak, Alaska
 K09QW-D in King Cove, Alaska
 K09QX-D in St. Michael, Alaska
 K09RA-D in Sand Point, Alaska
 K09RB-D in St. Paul, Alaska
 K09RC-D in Unalakleet, Alaska
 K09RE-D in St. George, Alaska
 K09RF-D in Eagle Village, Alaska
 K09RP-D in False Pass, Alaska
 K09SA-D in Koyuk, Alaska
 K09SD-D in Lemhi, etc., Idaho
 K09SG-D in Goodnews Bay, Alaska
 K09SL-D in Kotlik, Alaska
 K09SP-D in Igiugig, Alaska
 K09SR-D in Port Lions, Alaska
 K09SU-D in Hildale, etc., Utah
 K09TH-D in Gunnison, Colorado, on virtual channel 2
 K09TK-D in Elfin Cove, Alaska
 K09TR-D in Kalskag, Alaska
 K09TT-D in Circle, Alaska
 K09TW-D in Venetie, Alaska
 K09TX-D in Kaltag, Alaska
 K09UP-D in Colville, Washington
 K09VC-D in Paisley, Oregon
 K09VL-D in Boyes & Hammond, Montana
 K09WB-D in Powderhorn, Colorado, on virtual channel 9, which rebroadcasts K25PT-D
 K09XK-D in Sheridan, Wyoming
 K09XL-D in Douglas, Wyoming
 K09XW-D in Palm Desert, etc., California
 K09XY-D in Coolin, Idaho
 K09YE-D in La Pine, Oregon
 K09YH-D in Scottsbluff, Nebraska
 K09YK-D in Durango, Purgatory, Colorado
 K09YO-D in Thomasville, Colorado
 K09YP-D in Mink Creek, Idaho, on virtual channel 7, which rebroadcasts KUED
 K09YR-D in Harlowton, Montana
 K09YT-D in Sula, Montana
 K09YW-D in Leamington, Utah
 K09YZ-D in Beeville-Refugio, Texas
 K09ZA-D in Leavenworth, Washington
 K09ZB-D in Havre, Montana
 K09ZK-D in Long Valley Junction, Utah
 K09ZN-D in Blanding/Monticello, Utah
 K09ZO-D in Juab, Utah
 K09ZP-D in Sigurd & Salina, Utah
 K09ZQ-D in Marysvale, Utah
 K09ZR-D in Woodland & Kamas, Utah
 K09ZS-D in Gateway, Colorado
 K09ZT-D in Beaver, Utah
 K09ZU-D in East Price, Utah, on virtual channel 5, which rebroadcasts KSL-TV
 K09ZV-D in Helper, Utah
 K09ZW-D in Roosevelt, etc., Utah, on virtual channel 5, which rebroadcasts KSL-TV
 K09AAD-D in Sitka, Alaska
 K09AAF-D in Monterey, California
 KACV-TV in Amarillo, Texas
 KAFT in Fayetteville, Arkansas
 KAWE in Bemidji, Minnesota, on virtual channel 9
 KBCI-LD in Bonners Ferry, Idaho
 KBHO-LD in Richmond, Texas
 KBMN-LD in Houston, Texas, on virtual channel 40
 KBOI-TV in Boise, Idaho
 KCAL-TV in Los Angeles, California, on virtual channel 9
 KCAU-TV in Sioux City, Iowa
 KCEN-TV in Temple, Texas
 KCFW-TV in Kalispell, Montana
 KCRG-TV in Cedar Rapids, Iowa
 KCTS-TV in Seattle, Washington, on virtual channel 9
 KDSE in Dickinson, North Dakota
 KECY-TV in El Centro, California
 KEZI in Eugene, Oregon
 KFNR in Rawlins, Wyoming
 KFWD in Fort Worth, Texas, on virtual channel 52
 KGMD-TV in Hilo, Hawaii
 KGUN-TV in Tucson, Arizona
 KIXE-TV in Redding, California
 KKCO in Paonia, Colorado
 KLRN in San Antonio, Texas
 KMSP-TV in Minneapolis, Minnesota, on virtual channel 9
 KMYU in St. George, Utah, to move to channel 21, on virtual channel 2
 KNPG-LD in Saint Joseph, Missouri, on virtual channel 21
 KOPA-CD in Gillette, Wyoming
 KPDS-LD in Wolcott, Indiana, on virtual channel 49
 KPNE-TV in North Platte, Nebraska
 KSDX-LD in San Diego, California, on virtual channel 9
 KTRE in Lufkin, Texas
 KUAC-TV in Fairbanks, Alaska
 KUBN-LD in Madras, Oregon
 KUSA in Denver, Colorado, on virtual channel 9
 KVIE in Sacramento, California, on virtual channel 6
 KVVG-LD in Porterville, California
 KVVU-TV in Henderson, Nevada
 KWES-TV in Odessa, Texas
 KXLH-LD in Helena, Montana
 KXMN-LD in Spokane, etc., Washington
 W09AF-D in Sylva, North Carolina
 W09AG-D in Franklin, North Carolina
 W09AT-D in Fajardo, Puerto Rico, on virtual channel 2, which rebroadcasts WKAQ-TV
 W09CZ-D in Roslyn, New York, on virtual channel 17
 W09DB-D in Williamsport, Pennsylvania
 W09DJ-D in Wilkes-Barre, etc., Pennsylvania
 W09DL-D in Mount Vernon, Illinois, on virtual channel 42
 WAFB in Baton Rouge, Louisiana
 WALA-TV in Mobile, Alabama
 WAOW in Wausau, Wisconsin
 WBON-LD in Richmond, Kentucky
 WBPH-TV in Bethlehem, Pennsylvania, on virtual channel 60
 WEDN in Norwich, Connecticut, on virtual channel 53
 WEQT-LD in Atlanta, Georgia, on virtual channel 9
 WFLA-TV in Tampa, Florida, on virtual channel 8
 WFMZ-TV in Allentown, Pennsylvania, uses WBPH-TV's spectrum, on virtual channel 69
 WGWW in Anniston, Alabama
 WHAM-TV in Rochester, New York
 WHCQ-LD in Cleveland, Mississippi
 WILL-TV in Urbana, Illinois
 WISH-TV in Indianapolis, Indiana, on virtual channel 8
 WJAL in Silver Spring, Maryland, uses WUSA's spectrum, on virtual channel 68
 WJCT in Jacksonville, Florida
 WJHL-TV in Johnson City, Tennessee
 WLVT-TV in Allentown, Pennsylvania, uses WBPH-TV's spectrum, on virtual channel 39
 WMAE-TV in Booneville, Mississippi
 WMEB-TV in Orono, Maine
 WMUM-TV in Cochran, Georgia
 WMUR-TV in Manchester, New Hampshire, on virtual channel 9
 WNDY-TV in Marion, Indiana, uses WISH-TV's spectrum, on virtual channel 23
 WNGF-LD in Gouverneur, New York
 WNIN in Evansville, Indiana
 WNSH-LD in Nashville, Tennessee
 WPGX in Panama City, Florida
 WPPT in Philadelphia, Pennsylvania, uses WBPH-TV's spectrum, on virtual channel 35
 WPVS-LD in Milwaukee, Wisconsin
 WRCX-LD in Dayton, Ohio
 WSUR-DT in Ponce, Puerto Rico, on virtual channel 9
 WSVN in Miami, Florida, on virtual channel 7
 WTOV-TV in Steubenville, Ohio
 WTTA in St. Petersburg, Florida, uses WLFA-TV's spectrum, on virtual channel 38
 WTVC in Chattanooga, Tennessee
 WTVD in Durham, North Carolina, on virtual channel 11
 WTVI in Charlotte, North Carolina, on virtual channel 42
 WUSA in Washington, D.C., on virtual channel 9
 WVPB-TV in Huntington, West Virginia
 WWTV in Cadillac, Michigan

The following stations, which are no longer licensed, formerly broadcast on digital channel 9:
 K09BJ-D in Entiat, Washington
 K09CL-D in Rock Island, Washington
 K09FF-D in Squilchuck St. Park, Washington
 K09QD-D in Huslia, Alaska
 K09QE-D in Larsen Bay, Alaska
 K09QL-D in Allakaket, Alaska
 K09RG-D in Kongiganak, Alaska
 K09RV-D in Arctic Village, Alaska
 K09SO-D in Chignik Lagoon, Alaska
 K09TM-D in Kakhonak, Alaska
 K09UB-D in Whittier, Alaska
 K09WP-D in Checkerboard, Montana
 K09XO-D in Homer, Alaska
 K09YQ-D in Ketchikan, Alaska
 KABY-TV in Aberdeen, South Dakota
 W09CT-D in Mathias, etc., West Virginia

References

09 digital